Theiss UAV Solutions, formerly known as Theiss Aviation, is an American aircraft manufacturer based in Salem, Ohio. The company specializes in the design and manufacture of unmanned aerial vehicles and at one time produced ultralight aircraft in the form of kits for amateur construction.

The president is Rachel Theiss and vice president is Shawn Theiss.

History
The company was formed in 1991 to produce ultralight aircraft kits using a new inexpensive, light-weight construction technique. The company produced two 1930s-style replica designs for the homebuilt market, the Theiss Speedster and the Theiss Sportster, which was introduced in 1998.

As a result of these designs in 1998 the company was approached by the head of the Tactical Electronic Warfare Division's Offboard Countermeasures Vehicle Research Section, United States Naval Research Laboratory to produce UAVs for the US Navy. This resulted in the design of the Theiss Tarzan, which entered Naval service as the Dakota II.

The company stopped working on manned general aviation aircraft to concentrate entirely on UAVs. Rebranded in 2015, the company is now known as Theiss UAV Solutions, LLC. The company produces a series of UAVs, including the Theiss NIRV (Nature Inspired Reconnaissance Vehicle) that is designed to resemble a soaring bird to conduct covert reconnaissance in urban and rural areas, with models that resemble a vulture, gull and hawk. The company also designs custom UAVs for customers.

Aircraft

References

External links

Unmanned aerial vehicle manufacturers of the United States
Homebuilt aircraft
Technology companies established in 1991
Manufacturing companies established in 1991
1991 establishments in Ohio
Manufacturing companies based in Ohio